DYPH (693 AM) is a relay station of DZRH, owned and operated by Manila Broadcasting Company. Its transmitter is located at MBC Palawan Broadcast Resources, 4th Floor Ascendo Suite, Malvar Street, Brgy. Mandaragat, Puerto Princesa.

References

External links
DZRH FB Page
DZRH Website

Radio stations in Puerto Princesa
DZRH Nationwide stations
Radio stations established in 1990